Anoscopus flavostriatus is a species of leafhoppers belonging to the family Cicadellidae. It is native to Europe.

References

Cicadellidae
Hemiptera of Europe
Insects described in 1799
Taxa named by Edward Donovan